The Lavras Sustainable Development Reserve is a sustainable development reserve in the Atlantic Forest biome and the state of São Paulo, Southeastern Brazil.

Location

The Lavras Sustainable Development Reserve is in the Cajati municipality of São Paulo.
It covers the basin of the Lavras River, with about 50 tributaries.
The landscape includes farmland and preserved forest. 
The Lavras waterfall could become a tourist attraction.

History

The Lavras Sustainable Development Reserve was one of several conservation units created by state law 12.810 of 21 February 2008, in which the Jacupiranga Mosaic was created from the former Jacupiranga State Park and its surrounding lands.
It was to support sustainable development of the existing traditional population and of others relocated there from the interior of the state parks.
The utilization plan for the reserve was approved by its deliberative council on 20 August 2010.
It was approved by the Forest Foundation on 12 December 2012.

Economy

The Sítio Lavras is an example of a family plot, a  site that contains  of banana trees and a large amount of native forest in various stages of regeneration.
The father works full time on the plot, and his son works there part time.
The plot is a demonstration agroforestry project monitored by the Cajatí Agroforestry Group.
In February 2014 residents of the neighborhood worked together to build a septic tank system for one of the ten families living in the reserve.
Materials cost about R$150 for the sanitary system, which protects the water table from contamination, using a model already used on about 80 rural properties belonging to Cooperafloresta members in Barra do Turvo.

Notes

Sources

Sustainable development reserves of Brazil
Protected areas established in 2008
Protected areas of the Atlantic Forest
Protected areas of São Paulo (state)
2008 establishments in Brazil